Amoron'i Mania is a region in central Madagascar bordering Vakinankaratra Region in north, Atsinanana in northeast, Vatovavy-Fitovinany in southeast, Haute Matsiatra in south, Atsimo-Andrefana in southwest and Menabe in west.

The capital of the region is Ambositra, and the population was 833,919 in 2018.

Administrative divisions
Amoron'i Mania Region is divided into four districts, which are sub-divided into 53 communes.

 Ambatofinandrahana District - 9 communes
 Ambositra District - 21 communes
 Fandriana District - 13 communes
 Manandriana District - 10 communes

Protected areas
Part of Fandriana-Vondrozo Corridor
Part of Marolambo National Park
 Itremo New Protected Area

References

EDBM

 
Regions of Madagascar